The Lotus Type 133 is an electric sedan coming out in 2023.  The car will compete with the Porsche Taycan.

Overview
Lotus Cars trademarked the names Etude and Envya, one of them being the Type 133's true name.

References

Upcoming car models
Lotus vehicles
Electric car models
Sports sedans